The National Council for a New America is a group of Republican Party members that is aimed at rebranding the party. The group was formed as a way to both rebound from recent setbacks, and to cast off the "party of no" labeling that the Republicans have been given by the Democrats.

The first meeting was conducted on May 2, 2009, in Arlington, Virginia.

History 

News reports cite sources that say the panel was born of conversations between Cantor and the members of the experts panel.

Members 

The council consists of a "National Panel of Experts". Members of the panel are:

 Haley Barbour
 Bobby Jindal
 Mitt Romney
 Jeb Bush
 John McCain
 Sarah Palin
 Newt Gingrich

The panel will report to Republican congressional leaders, including:

 John Boehner
 Eric Cantor
 Mike Pence
 Mitch McConnell
 Jon Kyl
 Lamar Alexander

References 

Republican Party (United States) organizations